Ebon Fisher is a pioneer of transmedia art, working at the intersection of art, biology and digital media. Informed by his exposure to cybernetics and feedback systems at the MIT Media Lab in the mid-1980s, Fisher has approached his work as an evolving collaboration with the world, culminating recently in a nervelike system of ethics conveyed through a transmedia world called The Nervepool.

Life and work
Cultivating what he terms "media organisms" in the plasma of mass communications, Ebon Fisher is one of the early, pre-web explorers of network culture and viral media. Wired Magazine dubbed him "Mr. Meme" in 1995 for his memetic approach to art and he has been lauded as one of the "Visionaries of the New Millennium." Drawn to both the formal and functional properties of nerves and networks, Fisher's work has followed a trajectory from neuron graffiti to his weblike media creation, The Nervepool.

 Neuron graffiti: Pittsburgh, PA (1980–82).
 Nerve Circle: Interactive rock theatre group, Boston, MA (1986–88).
 Network rituals: Information-sharing rituals in Williamsburg, Brooklyn (1989–98).
 Network ethics: Bionic ethics system, the Bionic Codes, which evolved into Zoacodes (1992-present).
 The Nervepool: Transmedia world with a "nervecenter" at Nervepool.net (1992-present).

In 1985, Fisher was one of the first instructors at the MIT Media Lab where he began his research into culture as "intercoding networks" of humans, machines and ecosystems. In 1986, sensing rock music's potential for popular intercoding, Fisher launched the multimedia rock band, Nerve Circle, in Boston, MA. In 1988 Nerve Circle's raucous, interactive production, "Evolution of the Grid," was shut down by the police leading to his eviction from his loft. This precipitated a move to Brooklyn in 1988. Fisher's experimental media rituals in the 1990s helped to build vital channels of communication in Williamsburg, Brooklyn. Fisher was one of the co-founders of a neighborhood-oriented arts movement called The Immersionists which included groups like Lalalandia, Fakeshop, The Pedestrian Project and large, interactive warehouse events like The Cat's Head, The Flytrap and Organism. The emergence of such street and warehouse culture in the early 1990s helped Williamsburg, Brooklyn, to grow into a landmark arts district.

Fisher's Immersionist works included the media-sharing gatherings at Minor Injury Gallery, Media Compressions, a phone-in community bulletin board, (718) SUBWIRE, an open, Anglo-Latino creative space situated in a traditional street festival, The Weird Thing Zone and the collectively defined philosophy, Wigglism. According to Domus Magazine, Fisher's bionic ritual, the Web Jam of 1993, and the large, collaborative warehouse event it catalyzed called Organism, became a "symbolic climax" to the emerging Williamsburg art scene. Newsweek dubbed the Web Jam a "sequel to the rave." Stemming from his media rituals Fisher developed a network-based system of ethics called Bionic Codes. These evolved into Zoacodes and have spawned an entire transmedia world with an evolving, web-like architecture, The Nervepool.

Fisher received an M.S. in visual studies from MIT in 1986 following a BFA from Carnegie-Mellon University in 1982. In 1998 he was invited by the University of Iowa to create a new digital art program, "Digital Worlds," which he directed for three years before being invited to teach at Hunter College in New York in 2001. He has lectured at numerous colleges and universities, including New York University, Sarah Lawrence College, Bennington College, the University of Washington and Columbia University. He has written on media and the arts for Art Byte, the Utne Reader, Digital Creativity, the Walker Arts Center and the New York Council for the Arts. His media works have been exhibited in museums and festivals around the world. His codes have been presented on the Guggenheim Museum's online CyberAtlas since 1997. His Zoacodes website has been presented by the Encyclopædia Britannica as one of the "Best of the Web" and his cybernetic terms have appeared in numerous dictionaries and glossaries.

Wigglism
Inspired by both the living community networks in Williamsburg, Brooklyn, and an increasingly collaborative internet culture, Ebon Fisher posted the first draft of his Wigglism Manifesto on the internet in 1996. He formally invited the public to contribute to its evolution, establishing Wigglism as one of the first intentionally open source systems of philosophy. From its inception Wigglism has promoted the notion that the truth, or that which seems true, is interactively constructed with the world as a whole, not just with other humans or in the limited text space known as discourse. As dialogues surrounding the evolving manifesto have suggested, the most significant property of an interactively determined truth is not its veracity but the vitality in the collaboration in which it emerges. Wigglism also points to a post-art, post-science, post-human world in which both objective reality and subjective aesthetics give way to a living, subjective ecosystem. This supports an emerging green culture underscored by an ethic of nurturing vital systems.

Current work
Ebon Fisher is continuing to cultivate The Nervepool and its system of network ethics, the Zoacodes. A retrospective of his works was presented at the University of Northern Iowa in 2005 and he was invited to be the 2005 Marjorie Rankin Scholar-in-Residence at Drexel University. He collaborated with NPR commentator, Andrei Codrescu, on the creation of a new Zoacode, "Signal Strangely," which reflected Codrescu's stormlike travel patterns as he sought support for the survivors of Hurricane Katrina (2006). Fisher was interviewed extensively in a documentary by Marcin Ramocki, Brooklyn DIY, which premiered at the Museum of Modern Art in 2009. In that same year, Fisher was a keynote speaker at the IT Revolutions conference in Venice, Italy, sponsored by the IEEE.

In 2006, he was invited by digital artists, Joseph Nechvatal and Julie Harrison, to teach the media arts as an Affiliate Professor at the Stevens Institute of Technology in Hoboken, New Jersey and to help in the development of a new interdisciplinary studio area called Art & Technology. Fisher designed a green screen video production studio for the program, taught 3D animation and transmedia courses and received, along with co-author, Prof. Quynh Dinh, a National Science Foundation grant for a "Transmedia Search Engine".

See also
 Jonathan Fineberg, Art Since 1940: Strategies of Being, Abrams/Prentice Hall, 1995/2000
 Claudia Steinberg, "Vis-a-vis Manhattan," Die Zeit, 1997
 Frank Popper, From Technological to Virtual Art, MIT Press
 Frank Popper, "Ebon Fisher," Contemporary Artists, ed. by Tom and Sarah Pendergast, St. James Press, 2002
 Ebon Fisher, Music, "Circulate All Sensation," in CD Anthology, State of the Union, compiled by Elliott Sharp, 1996
 Sylvie Myerson & Vidyut Jain, "Interview with Ebon Fisher," Sandbox Magazine, 1996
 David Alm, "Soft Machines: Ebon Fisher Coils into Gentle Linkage," RES Magazine, vol. 4 no. 4, 2001
 Ebon Fisher Wigglism Leonardo Journal Vol. 40, Number I
 Flash Art, Interview with Annie Herron, director of Test-Site Gallery, Brooklyn, Feb. 1993
 Charles Runette, "The New York Cyber 60," New York Magazine, Nov. 13, 1995

References

External links
 Ebon Fisher's Nervepool

American digital artists
Performance art in New York City
Living people
Postmodern artists
Artists from New York (state)
New media artists
American installation artists
MIT Media Lab people
Year of birth missing (living people)